Horismenus is a genus of hymenopteran insects of the family Eulophidae occurring primarily in the Americas.  over 400 species in the genus have been described. Horismenus species are often described as parasitizing other insects.

References

Key to Nearctic eulophid genera
Universal Chalcidoidea Database

Eulophidae
Taxa named by Francis Walker (entomologist)
Hymenoptera genera